Maynard '63 is an album released by Canadian jazz trumpeter Maynard Ferguson featuring tracks recorded in March 1962 and originally released on the Roulette label.

Reception 

AllMusic reviewer Scott Yanow stated "In addition to the exciting leader/trumpeter, the main soloists are altoist Lanny Morgan, Don Menza and Willie Maiden on tenors and pianist Mike Abene, all of whom excel on the bop-oriented music. This was one of the best big bands of the era".

Track listing 
All compositions by Mike Abene except where noted.
 "Antibes" (Don Rader) – 2:57
 "In Retrospect" (Ernie Wilkins) – 3:07
 "Let's Try" (Tom McIntosh) – 4:37
 "Guess Again" (Bill Mathieu) – 3:31
 "Hate Notes" (Don Menza) – 2:33
 "Sin Blues" (Rader) – 2:52
 "Overcoat Stomp" – 2:40
 "Fox Hunt" – 3:16
 "Spookin'" – 3:16
 "Knarf" – 4:41

Personnel 
Maynard Ferguson – trumpet, leader
Gene Coe, Natale Pavone, Don Rader – trumpet
John Gale, Kenny Rupp – trombone
Lanny Morgan – alto saxophone
Willie Maiden, Don Menza – tenor saxophone
Frank Hittner – baritone saxophone
Mike Abene – piano
Linc Milliman – bass
Rufus Jones – drums
Mike Abene (tracks 7-10), Bill Mathieu (track 4), Don Menza (track 5), Don Rader (tracks 1 & 6), Ernie Wilkins (track 2) – arrangers

References 

1963 albums
Maynard Ferguson albums
Roulette Records albums
Albums produced by Teddy Reig
Albums arranged by Ernie Wilkins